Justin Lee Bartha (born July 21, 1978) is an American actor, known for his roles as Riley Poole in the National Treasure film series, Doug Billings in The Hangover trilogy, and David Sawyer in the NBC comedy series The New Normal. He starred as Colin Morrello in the CBS All Access legal and political drama The Good Fight. In 2022, Bartha starred as Marshall Johnson in the critically acclaimed Atlanta standalone episode, Big Payback.

Early life
Bartha was born in Fort Lauderdale, Florida, and moved to West Bloomfield, Michigan when he was eight. His father, Stephen, is a commercial real estate agent while his mother, Betty, is a school teacher. He has one older brother, Jeffrey. Bartha was raised in a Reform Jewish family. After he graduated from West Bloomfield High School in 1996, he moved to New York City and studied filmmaking and theatre at New York University's Tisch School of Arts.

Career

Bartha began his film career behind the camera as a production assistant on the film Analyze This. His acting debut came with his first film, 54, as a clubgoer. He wrote and directed a short film, Highs and Lows, which was shown at the South by Southwest Film Festival in 2003. Additionally, he wrote, produced, and starred in an MTV pilot called The Dustin and Justin Show.

Bartha co-starred opposite Ben Affleck, Jennifer Lopez, Christopher Walken and Al Pacino in the critically bashed Gigli in 2003, before his co-starring role in the National Treasure franchise (2004; 2007) as Riley Poole. He reprised the role in the series continuation for Disney+.

In 2006, Bartha co-starred in the film Failure to Launch and NBC's sitcom Teachers which only aired six episodes.

In November 2007, Bartha was cast in an indie drama, Holy Rollers. His character lures a young Hasidic Jew (Jesse Eisenberg) into becoming an ecstasy dealer. Filming began in New York in the spring of 2008, and the film was released in 2010. Bartha re-teamed with Eisenberg for Eisenberg's critically acclaimed play, Asuncion. Bartha also starred alongside Catherine Zeta-Jones in the Bart Freundlich film, The Rebound which is about a 25-year-old man who starts a romance with his older single mother neighbor, the film began shooting in April 2008 in New York and finished in June. In The Hangover comedy film series, he played Doug Billings, one of the "Wolfpack" members who goes on weekend trips with the trio. After a wild nights of partying, he goes missing and his friends frantically search everywhere for him.

Bartha starred as Max in the Broadway revival of the play Lend Me a Tenor by Ken Ludwig. He performed alongside Tony Shalhoub, Anthony LaPaglia, Brooke Adams, and Jan Maxwell. A farcical comedy, it was directed by Stanley Tucci and started previews at the Music Box Theatre on March 11, 2010, with the official opening date on April 4, 2010. It was nominated for a Tony award for best revival of a play. In 2011, Bartha signed on to star in the premiere of Zach Braff's play All New People at Second Stage Theatre. All New People began June 28 and ran through mid-August. Anna Camp, David Wilson Barnes and Krysten Ritter co-starred in this production under the direction of Peter DuBois. In February 2012, Bartha signed on to co-star on the NBC comedy pilot The New Normal. On May 7, 2012, NBC ordered the project to series. The show was centered around a gay couple (played by Bartha and Andrew Rannells) and the surrogate mother (Georgia King) they selected to bear their child. It premiered on September 11, 2012, but was officially cancelled the next year on May 10, 2013.

In 2014, Bartha starred in another of Jesse Eisenberg's plays, A Little Part of All Of Us, alongside Eisenberg, for Playing On Air, a non-profit organization that "records short plays [for public radio and podcast] written by top playwrights and performed by outstanding actors."

Bartha has worked with the Matrix Theatre Company, guest directing their Teen Company in Are You Passing?, a play on the state of education in Detroit.

In 2018, Bartha co-starred as Colin Morrello in the first two seasons of the critically acclaimed CBS all-access drama, The Good Fight. In 2021, Bartha signed on to play Robert Morgenthau in the second season of the critically acclaimed EPIX hit drama, Godfather Of Harlem and co-starred opposite Jason Momoa in the Netflix movie Sweet Girl. In 2022, Bartha starred in the controversial and critically acclaimed standalone episode in the third season of Atlanta called, The Big Payback. Bartha plays a man named Marshall Johnson who finds out he must pay slavery reparations.

Personal life
Bartha married Pilates instructor and creator of B The Method  Lia Smith in Oahu, Hawaii, on January 4, 2014. On April 13, 2014, she gave birth to their daughter. On April 16, 2016, she gave birth to their second daughter.

Filmography

Music videos

References

External links
 
 

1978 births
Living people
20th-century American male actors
21st-century American male actors
American male film actors
American male stage actors
American male television actors
American Reform Jews
Jewish American male actors
Male actors from Fort Lauderdale, Florida
Male actors from Michigan
Tisch School of the Arts alumni
People from West Bloomfield, Michigan